James Bismark Holden (October 4, 1876 – April 10, 1956) was a businessman and a municipal and provincial politician from Alberta, Canada. He served as a member of the Legislative Assembly of Alberta from 1906 to 1913, sitting with the Liberal caucus in government. He also served as the mayor of Vegreville, Alberta from 1917 to 1945.

Alberta legislature
Holden ran for election to the Alberta Legislature in a by-election held on July 16, 1906, as a Liberal candidate in the electoral district of Vermilion. He won the seat by acclamation to hold the district for his party.

The 1909 boundary redistribution redistributed the Vermilion electoral district. Holden won election in the new Vegreville electoral district in the election held that year.

Holden did not run for a third term in office and so left the legislature at its dissolution in 1913.

Other activities
Holden briefly moved to Vancouver to get into the shipping business, but moved back to Alberta when it went bust. Holden married Gertrude Jane Worth.

After his provincial political career, James had a substantial municipal career serving many terms as Mayor of Vegreville, Alberta from 1917 to 1945.

Holden also attempted a career in federal politics. He ran for a seat to the House of Commons of Canada for the first time in the 1917 federal election. He ran as a government supporting candidate in the electoral district of Victoria but was defeated finishing second in the three-way race losing to William Henry White and finishing ahead of former Governor of Kansas, John W. Leedy.

Holden ran for federal office a second time in the 1921 again in the electoral district of Victoria. He lost the three-way race as the Conservative candidate in a landslide finishing a distant third place to United Farmers candidate William Lucas.

Holden would attempt federal over a number of years later for his third and last time in the 1935 Canadian federal election. This time he finished last place out of five candidates in the Vegreville district losing to William Hayhurst.

Late life and honors
The town of Holden, Alberta, founded in 1905, is named in his honor.

References

External links
Legislative Assembly of Alberta Members Listing

Alberta Liberal Party MLAs
Unionist Party (Canada) candidates in the 1917 Canadian federal election
Conservative Party of Canada (1867–1942) candidates for the Canadian House of Commons
Mayors of places in Alberta
1876 births
1956 deaths
People from Vegreville